The Myrhorod Regiment was one of the 10 territorial-administrative subdivisions of the Cossack Hetmanate. The regiment's capital was the city of Myrhorod, now in Poltava Oblast of central Ukraine.

The Myrhorod Regiment was founded in 1648. In 1649 the territory of Lubny Regiment was annexed to the Myrhorod Regiment. At that time the Regiment consisted of 16 sotnias. In 1658 part of the Regiment became recreated Lubny Regiment. In 1672 a few sotnias from the Chyhyryn Regiment were added to the regiments numbers.

During the 1774–1775 years, 4 sotnias from the regiment were added to Novorossiysk  governorate.

In 1782 on the territories of the regiment were 12 towns and 1,271 villages. During this year the regiment was disbanded and all of its territories were annexed to Kiev namestnichestvo.

Structure
During 1774—1775 the Regiment consisted of the following sotnias:
Bila Tserkva
Bohats
Holtviansk
Horodytsk
Khorol
Kremenchuk
Myrhorod (2)
Omelnyk
Ostapivka
Potoky
Shyshatsk
Sorochyntsi
Ustavytsk
Vlasivka
Yaresk

Commanders
Matvii Hladkyi (1649—1652)
Hryhorii Lisnytskyi (1653—1654, 1657—1658, 1660)
Pavlo Apostol (1659, 1671, 1672—1683)
Demian Apostol (1664—1666)
Hryhorii Apostol (1666—1668)
Hryhorii Hladkyi (1669—1670)
Mykhailo Kyiashko (1670—1671)
Danylo Apostol (1683—1727)
Pavlo Apostol (1727—1736)
Vasyl Kapnist (1737—1750)

References

Cossack Hetmanate Regiments
History of Poltava Oblast